Barbhitha High School is a high school situated in the southwestern part of Barpeta District, Assam and was founded in 1947 under Kalgachia revenue circle.

History
Barbhitha High school was previously known as Barbhitha Mouktab Madrassa and later it was converted to Barbhitha ME Madrassa in 1951 and named as Barbhitha High School in 1963.

Classes
Presently, the school teaches the sixth standard to 12th standard and the school is maintained by the Education Department, Government of Assam.

Fmaous Students

Prof Abdul Mannan 

Prof Bakshi Hazrat Ali Ahmed

Principal Mamtaz ali Khan

Engineer Abdul Kuddus

Engineer Main Uddin 

Abdul Khaleque (MP)

Dr Arifur Rahman

Dr Mahir Uddin

References

High schools and secondary schools in Assam
Barpeta district
Educational institutions established in 1947
1947 establishments in India